The following is a list of notable deaths in May 1991.

Entries for each day are listed alphabetically by surname. A typical entry lists information in the following sequence:
 Name, age, country of citizenship at birth, subsequent country of citizenship (if applicable), reason for notability, cause of death (if known), and reference.

May 1991

1
Jack Cope, 77, South African writer.
Charles Sutherland Elton, 91, English zoologist.
Frank N. Ikard, 78, American politician, member of the U.S. House of Representatives (1951–1961), heart attack.
Mary McAllister, 82, American silent film actress.
Cesare Merzagora, 92, Italian politician, acting president (1964).
Richard Thorpe, 95, American film director.

2
Richard Threlkeld Cox, 92, American physicist.
Robert Elter, 92, Luxembourgian footballer.
Susan Fassbender, 32, English singer, suicide.
Jens Haugland, 81, Norwegian politician.
Charles Kaufman, 86, American screenwriter, pneumonia.
Abby Crawford Milton, 110, American suffragist and supercentenarian.

3
Harry Gibson, 75, American musician, heart failure.
Truus Klapwijk, 87, Dutch Olympic swimmer (1924, 1928).
Jerzy Kosiński, 57, Polish-American novelist (Being There, The Painted Bird, Steps), suicide by asphyxiation.
Frank Leja, 55, American baseball player, heart attack.
Günther Noack, 78, German figure skater.
Yolande Plancke, 82, French Olympic sprinter (1928).
Carlos Márquez Sterling, 92, Cuban politician.
Margaret Tallichet, 77, American actress, cancer.

4
Dennis Crosby, 56, American actor and singer, son of Bing Crosby, suicide by gunshot.
George T. Delacorte Jr., 96, American magazine publisher.
Luigi Facelli, 92, Italian hurdler and Olympian.
Mohammed Khadda, 61, Algerian artist, lung cancer.
Chandravadan Mehta, 90, Indian playwright and author.
Xiaocun Sun, 84, Chinese politician.
Mohammed Abdel Wahab, 89, Egyptian singer, stroke.
Bernie Winters, 60, English comedian, stomach cancer.

5
Rolf Bremer, 64, German politician.
Chaim Gross, 89, Austrian-American sculptor and educator, heart attack.
Hermann Kopf, 89, German politician.
Jimmy Lile, 57, American knifemaker.
Rune Lindblad, 67, Swedish composer.
Richard A. Teague, 67, American automobile designer.
Arthur Trudeau, 88, American Army lieutenant general.

6
Mehrdad Avesta, 60, Iranian poet, heart attack.
Virgil Calotescu, 63, Romanian film director.
Thomas A. Carlin, 62, American actor (Caddyshack, The Pope of Greenwich Village, Ragtime).
Konstantinos Engolfopoulos, 79, Hellenic Navy officer.
Wilfrid Hyde-White, 87, British actor (My Fair Lady, The Third Man, Buck Rogers in the 25th Century), heart failure.
Guido Martina, 85, Italian comic writer.
Chucky Mullins, 21, American football player and quadriplegic, pulmonary embolism.

7
Hans Bender, 84, German parapsychologist.
Lucien Duquesne, 90, French Olympic runner (1920, 1924, 1928).
Glenn Eagleston, 70, American flying ace.
Fred Eggan, 84, American anthropologist.
Bill McPeak, 64, American football player, heart attack.
Alexandre Prigogine, 78, Russian mineralogist and ornithologist.
Wolfgang Reichmann, 59, German actor, heart attack.
István Zsolt, 69, Hungarian football referee.

8
Edward G. Breen, 82, American politician, member of the U.S. House of Representatives (1949–1951).
Ralph Theodore Breyer, 87, American Olympic swimmer (1924).
Ronnie Brody, 72, British actor.
Joseph Kramm, 83, American playwright.
Hilde Krüger, 78, German actress.
Jean Langlais, 84, French composer.
Ronald McKie, 81, Australian novelist, kidney disease.
Mireille Perrey, 87, French stage and film actress.
Michel Robida, 81, French writer.
Rudolf Serkin, 88, Austrian-American pianist, cancer.
Cedric Tallis, 76, American baseball executive, heart attack.
Alun Thomas, 65, Welsh rugby player.
Friedelind Wagner, 73, German opera director.

9
Yanka Dyagileva, 24, Russian poet and singer-songwriter, suicide.
Charles Fox, 69-70, English jazz critic.
Flip Keegstra, 76, Dutch Olympic sailor (1948, 1952).
István Messzi, 29, Hungarian Olympic weightlifter (1988), traffic collision.
Ross Story, 71, Australian politician.

10
Béla Balassa, 63, Hungarian economist.
Thomas Leather, 80, Australian cricket player.
Georg Strobl, 81, German ice hockey player and Olympic medalist.
Teisutis Zikaras, 68, Lithuanian-Australian sculptor.

11
Ho Dam, 62, North Korean politician.
Dino Di Luca, 88, Italian actor.
Jusuf Hatunić, 40, Yugoslav football player.
Friedrich Issak, 75, Estonian javelin thrower and journalist.

12
Danny Little Bear, 53, American professional wrestler, liver cancer.
Leland Hickman, 56, American poet, AIDS.
Deny King, 81, Australian naturalist, environmentalist, and painter, heart attack.
Konstantin Sokolsky, 86, Latvian singer.

13
Abderrahmane Farès, 80, Algerian politician.
Hal Gregg, 69, American baseball player.
David Mercer MacDougall, 86, Hong Kong politician.
Delia Parodi, 78, Argentine politician.
Carl Weinrich, 86, American organist.

14
Giampiero Albertini, 63, Italian actor, heart attack.
Joy Batchelor, 77, English animator.
Agehananda Bharati, 68, American Hindu monk and anthropologist, cancer.
Omar Truman Burleson, 85, American politician, member of the U.S. House of Representatives (1947–1978).
Aladár Gerevich, 81, Hungarian Olympic fencer.
High Echelon, 24, American thoroughbred racehorse.
Jiang Qing, 77, Chinese actress and politician, widow of Mao Zedong, suicide by hanging.
José María Rodero, 68, Spanish actor.
Frank Sanucci, 90, Argentine-American composer.

15
Shintarō Abe, 67, Japanese politician, liver cancer.
Reno Browne, 70, American actress, cancer.
Amadou Hampâté Bâ, 90-91, Malian writer and ethnologist.
Andreas Floer, 34, German mathematician, suicide.
Ken Jones, 88, American baseball player.
Ronald Lacey, 55, English actor (Raiders of the Lost Ark, Red Sonja, The Adventures of Buckaroo Banzai Across the 8th Dimension), liver cancer.
Kalindi Charan Panigrahi, 89, Indian writer.
Fritz Riess, 68, German racing driver.
Ed Weir, 88, American gridiron football player.
İhsan Yüce, 62, Turkish actor.
Vukašin Šoškoćanin, 32, Yugoslav military commander, drowned.

16
Rufe Persful, 84, American criminal.
Herbert Schäfer, 63, German football player.
Willem Jacob Visser, 76, Dutch linguist.
Osmar White, 82, Australian journalist.

17
Jean Charles Snoy et d'Oppuers, 83, Belgian diplomat.
Maurie Dunstan, 62, Australian footballer.
Göthe Grefbo, 69, Swedish actor.
G. Evelyn Hutchinson, 88, English ecologist.
Herman Kalckar, 83, Danish biochemist.
Harry Rée, 76, British academic.
Ross Somerville, 88, Canadian golfer.
Tom Trana, 53, Swedish rally driver, cancer.
Ilse Trautschold, 85, German actress.

18
Gerd Achgelis, 82, German aviator.
Edwina Booth, 86, American actress.
Muriel Box, 85, English screenwriter and director.
Nicholas Elko, 81, American Catholic prelate.
Litzi Friedmann, 81, Austrian spy for the Soviet Union.
Gunnar Johansson, 85, Swedish composer.
Rudolf Nierlich, 25, Austrian skier, traffic collision.
Jimmy Thomson, 64, Canadian ice hockey player, heart attack.
Hoang Van Hoan, 85-86, Vietnamese politician.

19
Gabino Arregui, 76, Argentine footballer.
Lloyd Butler, 66, American Olympic rower (1948).
Odia Coates, 49, American singer, breast cancer.
Royce Goodbread, 83, American football player.
Wim Lakenberg, 70, Dutch football player.
Mario Panzeri, 79, Italian composer.
Greg Rice, 75, American long-distance runner, stroke.
Nexhmedin Zajmi, 75, Albanian artist.

20
Milko Bambič, 86, Italian artist.
Bill Champion, 69, American racing driver.
Zdzisław Kostrzewa, 35, Polish footballer.
Joseph J. Maraziti, 78, American politician, member of the U.S. House of Representatives (1973–1975).
Pete Runnels, 63, American baseball player, stroke.

21
Ioan P. Culianu, 41, Romanian historian and philosopher, shot.
Nicholas Dante, 49, American dancer and writer, AIDS.
Rajiv Gandhi, 46, Indian politician, prime minister (1984–1989), suicide bombing.
Julián Orbón, 65, Cuban composer, cancer.

22
Lino Brocka, 52, Filipino film director, traffic collision.
Shripad Amrit Dange, 91, Indian politician.
Valentin Iremonger, 73, Irish diplomat and poet.
Derrick Henry Lehmer, 86, American mathematician.
Jacob Millman, 79-80, Ukrainian-American electrical engineer.
Stan Mortensen, 69, English footballer.
Stan Richards, 59-60, American sportscaster.
Ernie Robinson, 83, English footballer.

23
Manning Clark, 76, Australian historian.
Henri Dauban de Silhouette, 90, British javelin thrower and Olympian.
David H. Frisch, 73, American nuclear physicist.
Wilhelm Kempff, 95, German pianist.
René Lefèvre, 93, French actor.
Fletcher Markle, 70, Canadian filmmaker, heart failure.
Kemal Satır, 80, Turkish politician.
Jean Van Houtte, 84, Belgian politician, prime minister (1952–1954).

24
John Anderton, 61, South African Olympic sprinter (1952).
Mo Bassett, 60, American football player.
Gene Clark, 46, American singer-songwriter (The Byrds), peptic ulcer disease.
Pat Scantlebury, 73, Panamanian-American baseball player.
Juozas Ūdras, 66, Lithuanian Olympic fencer (1952, 1956).

25
Lorne MacLaine Campbell, 88, Scottish army officer.
Eddie Fullerton, 56, Irish politician, shot.
Gunnar Johansen, 85, Danish-American pianist, liver cancer.
Doug Nott, 79, American football player.

26
Aleksandar Benko, 66, Yugoslav footballer.
José Caballero, 75, Spanish painter.
Doris M. Curtis, 77, American geologist.
Claudine Dupuis, 67, French actress.
Tom Eyen, 50, American playwright and lyricist (Dreamgirls), AIDS.
Tim Landers, 80, Irish footballer.
Eugène Lourié, 88, French filmmaker, stroke.
Kisaburo Osawa, 80-81, Japanese aikido teacher.
John Price, 71, American competitive sailor and Olympic silver medalist.
Wilfrid Roberts, 90, British politician.
Nick Wasnie, 88, Canadian ice hockey player.
Hailu Yimenu, -9, Ethiopian politician, suicide.

27
Ed Dodd, 88, American cartoonist (Mark Trail).
Eric Heffer, 69, British politician.
Herman Struve Hensel, 89, American lawyer, heart failure.
Leopold Nowak, 86, Austrian musicologist.

28
Roy Cullenbine, 77, American baseball player, heart disease.
Garton Hone, 90, Australian tennis player.
Victor Aloysius Meyers, 93, American politician and musician.
Ethel L. Payne, 79, American journalist, editor, and foreign correspondent.
Walter Steinbauer, 45, German bobsledder and Olympic medalist.

29
Margaret Barr, 86, Australian choreographer.
Peter Betz, 61, German Olympic rower (1952).
Coral Browne, 77, Australian-American actress (An Englishman Abroad, Dreamchild, The Ruling Class), breast cancer.
Andrew Mensaros, 69, Australian politician.
John Tronolone, 80, American mobster (Cleveland crime family).
Henry Walston, Baron Walston, 78, British politician.

30
Edgar Bodenheimer, 83, German-American author and law professor.
Manolo Gómez Bur, 74, Spanish actor.
Uma Shankar Dikshit, 90, Indian politician.
Walter Dirks, 90, German theologian.
Roland V. Libonati, 93, American politician, member of the U.S. House of Representatives (1957–1965).
Jim Magnuson, 44, American baseball player, alcohol poisoning.
Eugene Oberst, 89, American football player, javelin thrower, and Olympic medalist .
Lafayette G. Pool, 71, American tank commander.

31
Rubens Josué da Costa, 62, Brazilian football player.
Ronald Garvey, 87, British colonial administrator.
Magnus Hestenes, 85, American mathematician.
Ian Milner, 79, New Zealand political scientist and alleged KGB spy.
Robert Schlapp, 91, British physicist.
Hans Schwartz, 78, German footballer.
Angus Wilson, 77, English novelist, stroke.
Artur Woźniak, 77, Polish football player.
Yuri Zhukov, 83, Soviet journalist, publicist and political figure.

References 

1991-05
 05